The Ladakh Range is a mountain range in central Ladakh in India with its northern tip extending into Baltistan in Pakistan. It lies between the Indus and Shyok river valleys, stretching to 230 miles  (370 km). Leh, the capital city of Ladakh, is on the foot of Ladakh Range in the Indus river valley.

Geography
The Ladakh Range is regarded as a southern extension of the Karakoram  Range, which runs for 230 miles (370 km) from the confluence of the Indus and Shyok rivers in Baltistan to the Tibetan border of Ladakh in the southeast. The southern extension of the Ladakh Range is called the Kailash Range, especially in Tibet.

The Ladakh Range forms the northeastern bank of the Indus River and the western bank of the Shyok River.

The Ladakh Range has an average height of about 6,000 metres and has no major peaks. Some of its peaks are less than 4,800 metres.

The main mountain passes are Chorbat (5,090 metres), Digar La (5,400 metres), Khardung La (5,602 metres), Chang La (5,599 metres) and Tsaka La (4,724 metres).

Habitation 

The city of Leh, a little way from the Indus River along the Khardung La valley, is a historic trading town with trade routes to Yarkand and Tibet on the one hand, and Srinagar and rest of the Indian subcontinent on the other. The summer route from Leh to Yarkand passed through Khardung La to pass into the Nubra valley and thence to Yarkand via the Karakoram Pass and Suget Pass (in the Trans-Karakoram Tract). The winter route passed through Digar La to reach the Shyok river valley and, again, reach the Karakoram Pass. The trade route to Tibet went via Gartok in the Indus river valley at the foot of the Kailash Range. By the Treaty of Tingmosgang signed in 1684, Ladakh had the exclusive right to trade in the pashmina wool from Tibet, which led to its prosperity.

Leh was for centuries trade centre for fine pashmina wool (once worth its weight in gold); yak and pony caravans brought in pashmina from Tibet, turquoise, coral and silver from Yarkand and Kashgar, spices, fabrics from India and silk from Kashmir.

Two English explorers, William Moorcroft and George Trebeck visiting Leh in 1820, were stunned seeing a town of such wealth located in midst of obviously arid desert land.

The nomadic Changpa rely mostly on sheep and yak herding for subsistence in the Ladakh Range. Tibet's Chang Tang plain, most remote section of Himalayas, is extreme high country; here the valleys are about 14,000 feet above sea level.

Ladakh is a beautiful desert region. Culturally/geographically close to Tibet, it has few resources with an extreme climate. The Buddhist Ladakhis with their traditions and intimate knowledge of local environment have survived and actually prospered, in spite of centuries of invasions from the Mongols (from central Asia), the Baltis (from west), the Dogras (from south) and even Tibetans (from east). The mixed ethnic origins are reflected in their faces.

The extension of the Ladakh Range into China is known as Kailash Range.

References

Bibliography

External links 

 Romesh Bhattacharji, Maps of Ladakh: Changing yet Unchanged, via Bame Duniya blogspot, 19 March 2013

Landforms of Ladakh
Geography of Ladakh
Mountain ranges of India
Landforms of Gilgit-Baltistan
Geography of Gilgit-Baltistan
Mountain ranges of Pakistan